Anderson Street may refer to:

Anderson Street Conservation Park
Anderson Street (NJT station)
Anderson Street Bridge (Hackensack River)